Sunday Abiodun Olukoya was a Nigerian navy captain who served as Military Administrator of Ondo State from September 1990 to January 1992 during the military regime of General Ibrahim Babangida.
Born on 6 April 1949, he retired as a Rear Admiral in 1999 and died on 23 August 2021. During his tenure, he named Ondo State the Sunshine State and was among past governors of Ondo State who praised the achievements of Governor Olusegun Mimiko and charged him to ensure that his administration continues to develop the state.

References

Nigerian Navy officers
Living people
Governors of Ondo State
Yoruba military personnel
Yoruba politicians
Year of birth missing (living people)